St. Paul's Cathedral, Yakima, Washington, United States, is a Catholic cathedral and a parish church in the Diocese of Yakima.

History

Four Missionary Oblates of Mary Immaculate were the first Catholic priests to visit the Yakima River Valley.  Fathers Charles Pandosy, Casimir Chirouse, George Blancehett and Father Richard established St. Joseph Mission in 1847.  They came at the invitation of Chief Owhi of the Yakima tribe.
  
The first Mass for St. Paul's parish was celebrated on March 19, 1914, which was Easter Sunday, in the chapel of St Elizabeth Hospital in Yakima.  Two hundred people attended the liturgy celebrated by the parish's first pastor, the Rev. Robert Armstrong.  Armstrong bought five acres of land later that same year from D.E. Lesh for the parish.  It was bounded by Chestnut and Walnut Streets, and 14th and 12th Avenues.  Groundbreaking for a combination school and church building was held in July.  
 
Excavation for the present church was begun on February 8, 1926. The architect for the Spanish Colonial Revival style church was John Maonly.  Armstrong celebrated the first Mass in the church once again on Easter Sunday, April 18, 1927.

Pope Pius XII created the Diocese of Yakima on July 18, 1951 from the Diocese of Seattle, and St. Paul's was named the diocesan cathedral. The Rev. Joseph Dougherty of Seattle was named first bishop of the diocese.  
 
The cathedral was expanded from 1954 to 1955.  A terazzo floor and new oak pews were installed.  The seating capacity of the cathedral was increased to 800 at this time.  New confessionals, chapel, baptistery and enlarged sacristy were also added.

Architecture
St. Paul's Cathedral is a cross-shaped building that is capped with a red tile roof.  The main facade was dominated by a  tower topped.  It is capped with a glazed tile dome and a bronze cross. On the opposite side of the building is a rounded apse where the altar is located.

See also
List of Catholic cathedrals in the United States
List of cathedrals in the United States
Saint Paul Cathedral School (Yakima, Washington)

References

External links

 Official Cathedral Site
 Diocese of Yakima Official Site

Christian organizations established in 1914
Roman Catholic churches completed in 1927
Paul Yakima
Roman Catholic Diocese of Yakima
Roman Catholic churches in Washington (state)
Buildings and structures in Yakima, Washington
Spanish Revival architecture in Washington (state)
20th-century Roman Catholic church buildings in the United States